Coleophora subparcella is a moth of the family Coleophoridae. It is found in Afghanistan and Turkestan.

The larvae feed on Artemisia turanica. They create a leafy case, consisting of masticated apices (apexes) of individual leaf blades arranged in an imbricate (overlapping) pattern on the upper and lower sides. The valve is two-sided. The length of the case is 6-6.5 mm and it is yellowish-chocolate-brown in color. Larvae can be found from the beginning of June and (after diapause) from April to May.

References

subparcella
Moths of Asia
Moths described in 1967